Gerald Kristin Evans (born September 28, 1968) is a former American football tight end in the National Football League. He played for the Denver Broncos from 1993 to 1995. He played college football at Toledo.

References

1968 births
Living people
Sportspeople from Lorain, Ohio
Players of American football from Ohio
American football tight ends
Toledo Rockets football players
Denver Broncos players